The Auckland Cup is an annual race held by the Auckland Racing Club (ARC). It is an Open Handicap for thoroughbred racehorses competed on the flat turf over 3200 metres (two miles)  at Ellerslie Racecourse in Auckland, New Zealand.

The race was formerly graded as a Group One (G1) event but as from 2022 is a Group 2.

It was first contested in 1874.

History

The first meeting of the Auckland Racing Club was in May 1874. One of the events, run over a distance of  miles, was named the Auckland Cup. This race was won by Mr. J Watt's three-year-old Batter. At the Summer Meeting of 1874 the Auckland Cup was run on Boxing Day over a distance of two miles and in subsequent published records of the club this race is shown as being the first official, recognised Auckland Cup contest.

This race was won by Templeton who must have been an impressive horse as to inspire Thomas Bracken (composer of 'God Defend New Zealand') to write a requiem of sorts to his fading prowess called Old Templeton. The day was reviewed positively in the 28 December issue of the New Zealand Herald, and was found to be absent of ‘sheanannaking’ and ‘hanky-panky’ and that everything was ‘above-board’ and ‘up hill and down straight’.

In 1898 W H Bartlett filmed Uhlan winning the Auckland Cup at Ellerslie Racecourse for the entrepreneur Alfred Henry Whitehouse. This was the first time a horse-race had been filmed in New Zealand.

Scheduling

The race was run on Boxing Day from in its inception until 1958 and from then until 2006 it was on New Year's Day.

Since 2006, the race has been contested on the second Saturday of Auckland Cup Week at the beginning of March on the same race day as the New Zealand Stakes and the Sistema Stakes (Ellerslie Sires Produce Stakes). The 2021 Barfoot & Thompson Auckland Cup was run on Saturday 13 March at approximately 5.30pm. It is typically the second-to-last race run on the final day of Auckland Cup Week.

For many years the Auckland Cup was the richest horse race in New Zealand. However, it has been surpassed in recent years by the New Zealand Derby and Karaka Million two year old and three year old races.

Notable winners

The Auckland Cup has been won by such notable horses as:

 Beau Vite (1940) who won the 1940 and 1941 Cox Plate. 
 Beaumaris (1950).
 Castletown (1992) who also won the Wellington Cup three times.
 Cuddle (1935 and 1936) who also won the Doncaster Handicap and All Aged Stakes.
 Il Tempo (1969 and 1970) who also won the Wellington Cup in world record time of 3:16.2 for the two miles.
 Jezabeel (1998) who also won the 1998 Melbourne Cup.
 Kindergarten (1942) who was one of five inaugural inductees into the New Zealand Racing Hall of Fame.
 Nelson (1885–87), an Australian champion who greeted the judge at the head of the field three times.

Auckland Cup and Avondale Cup double

In recent years the following Auckland Cup winners have also won the Avondale Cup:
 Glory Days: 2019
 El Soldado: 2016 Auckland Cup and 2017 Avondale Cup
 Who Shot Thebarman: 2014
 Sangster: 2013
 Spin Around: 2009 Auckland Cup and 2007 Avondale and Counties Cups

Race results since 1958

Previous winners

The following are earlier winners of the Auckland Cup.

1957 – NOT HELD
1956 – Yeman
1955 – Tesla
1954 – Arawa
1953 – Coaltown
1952 – Rev
1951 – Classowa
1950 – Beaumaris
1949 – Swanee
1948 – Frances
1947 – Balgowan
1946 – Sylis
1945 – Expanse
1944 – Foxwyn
1943 – Lord Chancellor
1942 – Kindergarten
1941 – Piastre (AUS)
1940 – Beau Vite
1939 – Cheval De Volee
1938 – Cheval De Volee
1937 – The Buzzer
1936 – Cuddle
1935 – Cuddle 
1934 – Gold Trail
1933 – Minerval
1932 – Fast Passage
1931 – Admiral Drake
1930 – Motere
1929 – Concentrate
1928 – Corinax (AUS)
1927 – Rapier
1926 – Tanadees (AUS)
1925 – Rapine
1924 – Te Kara
1923 – Muraahi/Te Kara
1922 – Scion
1921 – Malaga
1920 – Starland
1919 – Karo
1918 – Mascot
1917 – Fiery Cross
1916 – Depredation
1915 – Balboa
1914 – Warstep
1913 – Sir Solo
1912 – Bobrikoff
1911 – Santa Rosa
1910 – Waimangu
1909 – All Red
1908 – All Red
1907 – Zimmerman
1906 – Master Delaval
1905 – Putty
1904 – Mahutonga
1903 – Wairiki
1902 – Siege Gun
1901 – St. Michael
1900 – Blue Jacket
1899 – Blue Jacket
1898 – Uhlan
1897 – Antares
1896 – Nestor
1895 – Anita
1894 – Lottie
1893 – Pegasus
1892 – St. Hippo
1891 – Pinfire
1890 – Crackshot
1889 – Leopold
1888 – Lochiel
1887 – Nelson (AUS)
1886 – Nelson (AUS)
1885 – Nelson (AUS)
1884 – The Poet
1883 – Salvage
1882 – Welcome Jack
1881 – King Quail
1880 – Foul Play
1879 – Ariel
1878 – Ariel
1877 – Lara
1876 – Ariel
1875 – Kingfisher
1874 – Templeton

References

 Sporting Records of New Zealand. Todd, Sydney. (1976) Auckland, New Zealand: Moa Publications.  
  The Great Decade of New Zealand racing 1970-1980. Glengarry, Jack. William Collins Publishers Ltd, Wellington, New Zealand.
 New Zealand Thoroughbred Racing Annual 2018 (47th edition). Dennis Ryan, Editor, Racing Media NZ Limited, Auckland, New Zealand.
 New Zealand Thoroughbred Racing Annual 2017 (46th edition). Dennis Ryan, Editor, Racing Media NZ Limited, Auckland, New Zealand.
 New Zealand Thoroughbred Racing Annual 2012 (41st edition). Birch, Andrew, Editor. New Zealand Thoroughbred Marketing, Hamilton, New Zealand.
 New Zealand Thoroughbred Racing Annual 2009 (39th edition). Clark, Adrian, Editor. New Zealand Thoroughbred Marketing, Hamilton, New Zealand.
 New Zealand Thoroughbred Racing Annual 2008 (37th edition). Bradford, David, Editor. Bradford Publishing Limited, Paeroa, New Zealand.
 New Zealand Thoroughbred Racing Annual 2005 (34th edition). Bradford, David, Editor. Bradford Publishing Limited, Paeroa, New Zealand.
 New Zealand Thoroughbred Racing Annual 2004 (33rd edition). Bradford, David, Editor. Bradford Publishing Limited, Paeroa, New Zealand.
 New Zealand Thoroughbred Racing Annual 2000 (29th edition). Bradford, David, Editor. Bradford Publishing Limited, Auckland, New Zealand.
 New Zealand Thoroughbred Racing Annual 1997 (26th edition). Dillon, Mike, Editor. Mike Dillon's Racing Enterprises Ltd, Auckland, New Zealand.
 New Zealand Thoroughbred Racing Annual 1995 (24th edition). Dillon, Mike, Editor. Mike Dillon's Racing Enterprises Ltd, Auckland, New Zealand.
 New Zealand Thoroughbred Racing Annual 1994 (23rd edition). Dillon, Mike, Editor. Meadowset Publishing, Auckland, New Zealand.
 New Zealand Thoroughbred Racing Annual 1991 (20th edition). Dillon, Mike, Editor. Moa Publications, Auckland, New Zealand.
 New Zealand Thoroughbred Racing Annual 1990 (19th edition). Dillon, Mike, Editor. Moa Publications, Auckland, New Zealand.
 New Zealand Thoroughbred Racing Annual 1987 (16th edition). Dillon, Mike, Editor. Moa Publications, Auckland, New Zealand.
 New Zealand Thoroughbred Racing Annual 1986 (15th edition). Dillon, Mike, Editor. Moa Publications, Auckland, New Zealand.
 New Zealand Thoroughbred Racing Annual 1985 (14th edition). Costello, John, Editor. Moa Publications, Auckland, New Zealand.
 New Zealand Thoroughbred Racing Annual 1984 (13th edition). Costello, John, Editor. Moa Publications, Auckland, New Zealand.
 New Zealand Thoroughbred Racing Annual 1983 (12th edition). Costello, John, Editor. Moa Publications, Auckland, New Zealand.
 New Zealand Thoroughbred Racing Annual 1982 (11th edition). Costello, John, Editor. Moa Publications, Auckland, New Zealand.
 New Zealand Thoroughbred Racing Annual 1981 (10th edition). Costello, John, Editor. Moa Publications, Auckland, New Zealand.
 New Zealand Thoroughbred Racing Annual 1980 (9th edition). Costello, John, Editor. Moa Publications, Auckland, New Zealand.
 New Zealand Thoroughbred Racing Annual 1979 (8th edition).Costello, John, Editor. Moa Publications, Auckland, New Zealand.
 New Zealand Thoroughbred Racing Annual 1978 (7th edition).Costello, John, Editor. Moa Publications, Auckland, New Zealand.
 New Zealand Thoroughbred Racing Annual 1976. Costello, John, Editor. Moa Publications, Auckland.
 The DB Racing Annual 1974. Bradford, David, Editor. Moa Publications, Auckland.
 The DB Racing Annual 1972. Bradford, David, Editor. Moa Publications, Auckland.

See also 

 Recent Winners of major NZ cup races
 Auckland Cup Week
 Bonecrusher New Zealand Stakes
 New Zealand Derby
 Wellington Cup
 New Zealand Cup

Horse races in New Zealand
Open long distance horse races
 
Events in Auckland